Poland is the name of some places in the U.S. state of New York:
 
Poland, Chautauqua County, New York, a town
Poland, Herkimer County, New York, a village